The 1904 Italian general strike occurred in September 1904, marking the first general strike ever in Italy.

The strike was called by the Chambers of Labor in several cities in response to several killings of striking workers, culminating in the shooting of a miner in Buggerru, Sardinia. Participation was strongest in the north and the Po Valley. The government headed by Prime Minister Giovanni Giolitti ordered local authorities to intervene as little as possible, predicting that the strike would die down on its own, which it did. Nevertheless, it shook public confidence in the strength of the state and the middle class's support for Giolitti.

The country would experience many general strikes in the years following 1904, with additional general strikes in 1905, 1906, 1909, 1911, and 1914.

References

Bibliography

Further reading

General strikes in Europe
1904 in Italy
Labor disputes in Italy